Shaneh Tarash (also Romanized as Shāneh Tarāsh; also known as Shāneh and Terāsh) is a village in Shahidabad Rural District, Bandpey-ye Gharbi District, Babol County, Mazandaran Province, Iran. At the 2006 census, its population was 462, in 129 families.

References 

Populated places in Babol County